Carrying On is the second studio album by American country music duo Montgomery Gentry. It was released in May 2001 via Columbia Nashville. Certified gold in the United States, the album produced only two singles: "She Couldn't Change Me" and "Cold One Comin' On," which reached numbers 2 and 23 on the Hot Country Singles chart, respectively.

Track listing

Charts

Weekly charts

Year-end charts

Singles

Certifications

Personnel 
According to Carrying On liner notes.
Montgomery Gentry
 Troy Gentry - vocals
 Eddie Montgomery - vocals

Musicians
 Larry Beaird – banjo
 Eric Darken – percussion
 Dan Dugmore – steel guitar, electric Dobro
 Glen Duncan – fiddle, mandolin
 Paul Leim – drums, percussion
 Chris Leuzinger – electric guitar
 Gary Lunn – bass guitar
 Anthony Martin – background vocals
 Steve Nathan – piano, synthesizer, Hammond B-3 organ
 Brent Rowan – electric guitar
 Joe Scaife – background vocals
 Randy Sorrells – steel guitar
 Biff Watson – acoustic guitar

Technical
 David Bryant – assistant engineering
 Jim Burnett – editing
 Marina Chavez – photography
 Greg Fogie – assistant engineering
 Randy LeRoy – editing
 Steve Marcantonio – engineering, mixing
Anthony Martin – associate production
 Glen Rose – photography
Joe Scaife – production
 Ronnie Thomas – editing
 Rollow Welch – art direction
 Hank Williams – mastering

References

2001 albums
Montgomery Gentry albums
Columbia Records albums